Gary McDonald (born 3 March 1953) is a former Australian rules footballer who played with St Kilda in the Victorian Football League (VFL).

McDonald started his football career in Western Australia where he played for Swans Districts. He represented his state at interstate football in 1975 and in 1978 made his debut for St Kilda. The club struggled during the three years he was at the club and he experienced victory just once in 14 games. McDonald kicked bags of three goals in successive weeks midway through the 1979 season.

References

Holmesby, Russell and Main, Jim (2007). The Encyclopedia of AFL Footballers. 7th ed. Melbourne: Bas Publishing.

1953 births
Living people
Australian rules footballers from Western Australia
St Kilda Football Club players
Swan Districts Football Club players